Steve or Stephen Ward may refer to:

People
Steve Ward (boxer) (born c.1956), British professional boxer, and the world's oldest
Steve Ward (businessman) (born 1955), American businessman, former CEO of Lenovo
Steve Ward (Colorado legislator), American politician
Steve Ward (computer scientist), American professor of computer science and engineering
Steve Ward (ice hockey) (born 1986), Canadian professional ice hockey defenceman
Stephen Ward (1912–1963), British osteopath and artist, a central figure in the 1963 Profumo affair
Stephen Ward (footballer) (born 1985), Irish footballer
Stephen Ward (weightlifter) (born 1973), English weightlifter
Steven Ward (cricketer) (born 1958), former English cricketer
Steven Ward (TV personality) (born 1980), host of the TV series Tough Love
Steve Ward, musician from the band Cherry Twister
Steve Ward, Tesla coil enthusiast responsible for the construction of the Zeusaphone

Theatre
Stephen Ward (musical), a 2013 musical by Andrew Lloyd Webber

See also
Stephen Ward Doubleday (1845–1926), American banker
Stephen Ward Sears, American historian